Victory station is a mass transit station in Dallas, Texas. It serves Trinity Railway Express commuter rail line, DART Light Rail trains, and DART buses. Located along the Stemmons Corridor in the Uptown neighborhood, the station opened in 2001 in the Victory Park development as a temporary platform shortly after the opening of the American Airlines Center.

History
The station's location was the subject of much debate during the planning and construction of the American Airlines Center.  DART originally wanted to extend light rail service up Houston Street, with a station between the proposed center and nearby upscale residential and office areas.  But the Dallas City Council, backed by developer Tom Hicks and his Victory Park development partners, forced DART to locate Victory Station on the other side of the center, near the existing freight rail line and Interstate 35E.

On October 2, 2003, the temporary platform was replaced by a permanent platform for the Trinity Railway Express and a future expansion of DART's light rail system (the future Orange and Green Lines). Full-time light rail service at the station began on September 14, 2009, with the opening of the Green Line.

On December 6, 2010, the Green Line was extended north to North Carrollton/Frankford Station. Special Red and Blue Line service to Victory was discontinued at that date, making transfers to the Green or Orange Line from West End Station necessary for passengers coming into Downtown on the Red and Blue Lines.

References

External links
DART.org - Victory Station
TRE - Victory Station

Dallas Area Rapid Transit light rail stations in Dallas
Trinity Railway Express stations
Railway stations in the United States opened in 2001
2001 establishments in Texas
Bus stations in Dallas
Railway stations in Dallas
Railway stations in Dallas County, Texas